Stephen Reville D.D., O.S.A. KGCHS (9 May 1844 – 19 September 1916) was a Bishop of Sandhurst, of Victoria.

Biography
Reville was born in Wexford on 9 May 1844. He entered the Augustinian order at Callan, and studied on the continent, taking the degree of Master in Philosophy and Sacred Theology at Ghent. Soon after his ordination in 1867, he was appointed President of St Laurence's Seminary, at Usher's Quay. Holding the office for seven years.

He accompanied the first Bishop of Sandhurst, Martin Crane, to Australia in 1875. However, the prelate's eyesight was deteriorating, therefore, Reville was appointed Coadjutor-Bishop, having previously held the office of Vicar-General and acted as administrator of the diocese from 1882 during Dr. Crane's absence. He was consecrated on 29 March 1885.

Reville became bishop on 21 October 1901. He was a Knight of the Equestrian Order of the Holy Sepulchre.

He died in Bendigo on 19 September 1916.

References

1844 births
1916 deaths
Augustinian friars
People from County Kilkenny
19th-century Roman Catholic bishops in Australia
20th-century Roman Catholic bishops in Australia
Roman Catholic bishops of Sandhurst
Knights of the Holy Sepulchre
Irish expatriate Catholic bishops
Contributors to the Catholic Encyclopedia